Thames Ironworks may refer to:

Thames Ironworks and Shipbuilding Company, a shipyard and ironworks in east London
Thames Ironworks F.C., the forerunner to West Ham United Football Club